Podocarpus salicifolius is a species of conifer in the family Podocarpaceae. It is found in Bolivia, Brazil, and Venezuela.

References

salicifolius
Least concern plants
Taxonomy articles created by Polbot